Hyalinobatrachinae is a subfamily of glass frogs (family Centrolenidae) that was established in 2009. They are found in the Americas from Mexico south to southeastern Brazil and Argentina.

The subfamily contains 32 species in two genera:
 Celsiella Guayasamin, Castroviejo-Fisher, Trueb, Ayarzagüena, Rada, and Vilà, 2009 (2 species)
 Hyalinobatrachium Ruiz-Carranza and Lynch, 1991 (30 species)

AmphibiaWeb gives a slightly higher species count as it includes two additional Hyalinobatrachium species that are placed in synonymy in the Amphibian Species of the World.

References

 
Amphibians of North America
Amphibians of Central America
Amphibians of South America